Loris Kessel (1 April 1950 – 15 May 2010) was a racing driver from Switzerland.

Biography
He was born in Lugano and died in Montagnola following a long illness.

He participated in six Formula One World Championship Grands Prix, debuting on 2 May 1976. He scored no championship points.

In 1976, he drove a Brabham for RAM, and in 1977 he drove his own Apollon-Williams, although this car was not a success.

Kessel ran a series of car dealerships in Switzerland and his own racing team, competing in Ferrari Challenge series in Italy and the main European series. The team also competes in the FIA GT3 European Championship with the same car.

Racing record

Complete European Formula Two Championship results
(key) (Races in bold indicate pole position; races in italics indicate fastest lap)

Complete Formula One World Championship results
(key)

Complete 24 Hours of Le Mans results

References

External links
Loris Kessel Auto
Kessel Racing 

1950 births
2010 deaths
Sportspeople from Lugano
Swiss racing drivers
Swiss Formula One drivers
Swiss motorsport people
European Formula Two Championship drivers
Deaths from leukemia
RAM Racing Formula One drivers
World Sportscar Championship drivers
International GT Open drivers
ADAC GT Masters drivers
Sports car racing team owners